Stayin' Up All Night is the eighth studio album by English-Irish singer Nathan Carter. It was released on 29 April 2016 by Decca Records. The album peaked at number one on the Irish Albums Chart and number 31 on the UK Albums Chart. The album includes the singles "Temple Bar" and "Liverpool".

Track listing

Charts

Release history

References

2016 albums
Decca Records albums
Nathan Carter albums